Telphusa quercicola is a moth of the family Gelechiidae. It is found in South Korea.

The wingspan is 12–14 mm. The forewings are clothed with dark grey scales and the basal, antemedian and median fascia are dark grey and weakly developed. There is a dark fuscous patch beyond the postmedian fascia, surrounded by yellowish white scales.

References

Moths described in 1992
Telphusa